An artificial enzyme is a synthetic organic molecule or ion that recreates one or more functions of an enzyme. It seeks to deliver catalysis at rates and selectivity observed in naturally occurring enzymes.

History
Enzyme catalysis of chemical reactions occur with high selectivity and rate. The substrate is activated in a small part of the enzyme's macromolecule called the active site. There, the binding of a substrate close to functional groups in the enzyme causes catalysis by so-called proximity effects. It is possible to create similar catalysts from small molecules by combining substrate-binding with catalytic functional groups. Classically, artificial enzymes bind substrates using receptors such as cyclodextrin, crown ethers, and calixarene.

Artificial enzymes based on amino acids or peptides have expanded the field of artificial enzymes or enzyme mimics. For instance, scaffolded histidine residues mimic certain metalloproteins and enzymes such as hemocyanin, tyrosinase, and catechol oxidase).

Artificial enzymes have been designed from scratch via a computational strategy using Rosetta. A December 2014 publication reported active enzymes made from molecules that do not occur in nature. In 2016, a book chapter entitled "Artificial Enzymes: The Next Wave" was published.

Nanozymes 
Nanozymes are nanomaterials with enzyme-like characteristics. They have been explored for applications such as biosensing, bioimaging, tumor diagnosis and therapy, and anti-biofouling.

1990s 
In 1996 and 1997, Dugan et al. discovered superoxide dismutase (SOD)-mimicking activities of fullerene derivatives.

2000s 
The term "nanozyme" was coined in 2004 by Flavio Manea, Florence Bodar Houillon, Lucia Pasquato, and Paolo Scrimin. A 2005 review article attributed this term to "analogy with the activity of catalytic polymers (synzymes)", based on the "outstanding catalytic efficiency of some of the functional nanoparticles synthesized". In 2006, nanoceria (CeO2 nanoparticles) was reported to prevent retinal degeneration induced by intracellular peroxides (toxic reactive oxygen intermediates) in rat. This was seen as indicating a possible route to a treatment for certain causes of blindness. In 2007 intrinsic peroxidase-like activity of ferromagnetic nanoparticles was reported by Yan Xiyun and coworkers as suggesting a wide range of applications in, for example, medicine and environmental chemistry, and the authors designed an immunoassay based on this property. Hui Wei and Erkang Wang then (2008) used this property of easily prepared magnetic nanoparticles to demonstrate analytical applications to bioactive molecules, describing a colorimetric assay for hydrogen peroxide and a sensitive and selective platform for glucose detection.

2010s 
, many review articles have appeared. A book-length treatment appeared in 2015, described as providing "a broad portrait of nanozymes in the context of artificial enzyme research", and a 2016 Chinese book on enzyme engineering included a chapter on nanozymes.

Colorimetric applications of peroxidase mimesis in different preparations were reported in 2010 and 2011, detecting, respectively, glucose (via carboxyl‐modified graphene oxide) and single-nucleotide polymorphisms (in a label-free method relying on hemin−graphene hybrid nanosheets), with advantages in both cost and convenience. A use of colour to visualise tumour tissues was reported in 2012, using the peroxidase mimesis of magnetic nanoparticles coated with a protein that recognises cancer cells and binds to them.

Also in 2012, nanowires of vanadium pentoxide (vanadia, V2O5) were shown to suppress marine biofouling by mimicry of vanadium haloperoxidase, with anticipated ecological benefits. A study at a different centre two years later reported V2O5 showing mimicry of glutathione peroxidase in vitro in mammalian cells, suggesting future therapeutic application. The same year, a carboxylated fullerene dubbed C3 was reported to be neuroprotective in a primate model of Parkinson's disease.

In 2015, a supramolecular nanodevice was proposed for bioorthogonal regulation of a transitional metal nanozyme, based on encapsulating the nanozyme in a monolayer of hydrophilic gold nanoparticles, alternately isolating it from the cytoplasm or allowing access according to a gatekeeping receptor molecule controlled by competing guest species; the device, aimed at imaging and therapeutic applications, is of biomimetic size and was successful within the living cell, controlling pro-fluorophore and prodrug activation. An easy means of producing  supercages was reported, along with a demonstration of their intrinsic peroxidase mimicry. A scaffolded "INAzyme" ("integrated nanozyme") arrangement was described, locating hemin (a peroxidase mimic) with glucose oxidase (GOx) in sub-micron proximity, providing a fast and efficient enzyme cascade reported as monitoring cerebral brain-cell glucose dynamically in vivo. A method of ionising hydrophobe-stabilised colloid nanoparticles was described, with confirmation of their enzyme mimicry in aqueous dispersion.

Field trials in West Africa were announced of a magnetic nanoparticle–amplified rapid low-cost strip test for Ebola virus.  was reported as displacing label DNA, adsorbed to nanoceria, into solution, where it fluoresces, providing a highly sensitive glucose test. Oxidase-like nanoceria was used for developing self-regulated bioassays. Multi-enzyme mimicking Prussian blue was developed for therapeutics. A review on metal organic framework (MOF)-based enzyme mimics was published. Histidine was used to modulate iron oxide nanoparticles' peroxidase-mimicking activities. Gold nanoparticles' peroxidase-mimicking activities were modulated via a supramolecular strategy for cascade reactions. A molecular imprinting strategy was developed to improve the selectivity of Fe3O4 nanozymes with peroxidase-like activity. A new strategy was developed to enhance the peroxidase-mimicking activity of gold nanoparticles by using hot electrons. Researchers designed gold nanoparticle–based integrative nanozymes with both surface-enhanced Raman scattering and peroxidase-mimicking activities for measuring glucose and lactate in living tissues. Cytochrome c oxidase mimicking activity of Cu2O nanoparticles was modulated by receiving electrons from cytochrome c. Fe3O4 nanoparticles were combined with glucose oxidase for tumor therapeutics. Manganese dioxide nanozymes were used as cytoprotective shells. An Mn3O4 nanozyme for Parkinson's disease (cellular model) was reported. Heparin elimination in live rats was monitored with two-dimensional MOF-based peroxidase mimics and AG73 peptide. Glucose oxidase and iron oxide nanozymes were encapsulated within multi-compartmental hydrogels for incompatible tandem reactions. A cascade nanozyme biosensor was developed for detection of viable Enterobacter sakazakii. An integrated nanozyme of GOx@ZIF-8(NiPd) was developed for tandem catalysis. Charge-switchable nanozymes were developed. Site-selective RNA splicing nanozyme was developed. A nanozymes special issue in Progress in Biochemistry and Biophysics was published. Mn3O4 nanozymes with the ability to scavenge reactive oxygen species were developed and showed in vivo anti-inflammatory activity. A proposal entitled "A Step into the Future – Applications of Nanoparticle Enzyme Mimics" was presented. Facet-dependent oxidase and peroxidase-like activities of palladium nanoparticles were reported. Au@Pt multibranched nanostructures as bifunctional nanozymes were developed. Ferritin-coated carbon nanozymes were developed for tumor catalytic therapy. CuO nanozymes were developed to kill bacteria in a light-controlled manner. Enzymatic activity of oxygenated CNT was studied. Nanozymes were used to catalyze the oxidation of L-tyrosine and L-phenylalanine to dopachrome. Nanozymes were presented as an emerging alternative to natural enzyme for biosensing and immunoassays. A standardized assay was proposed for peroxidase-like nanozymes. Semiconductor quantum dots were utilized as nucleases for site-selective photoinduced cleavage of DNA. Two-dimensional MOF nanozyme-based sensor arrays were constructed for detecting phosphates and probing their enzymatic hydrolysis. Nitrogen-doped carbon nanomaterials as specific peroxidase mimics were reported. Nanozyme sensor arrays were developed to detect analytes from small molecules to proteins and cells. A copper oxide nanozyme for Parkinson's disease was reported. Exosome-like nanozyme vesicles for tumor imaging were developed. A comprehensive review on nanozymes was published by Chemical Society Reviews. A progress report on nanozymes was published. eg occupancy as an effective descriptor was developed for the catalytic activity of perovskite oxide–based peroxidase mimics. A Chemical Reviews paper on nanozymes was published. A single-atom strategy was used to develop nanozymes. A nanozyme for metal-free bioinspired cascade photocatalysis was reported. Chemical Society Reviews published a tutorial review on nanozymes. Cascade nanozyme reactions to fix CO2 were reported. Peroxidase-like gold nanoclusters were used to monitor renal clearance. A copper–carbon hybrid nanozyme was developed for antibacterial therapy. A ferritin nanozyme was developed to treat cerebral malaria. Accounts of Chemical Research reviewed nanozymes. A new strategy called strain effect was developed to modulate metal nanozyme activity. Prussian blue nanozymes were used to detect hydrogen sulfide in the brains of living rats. Photolyase-like CeO2 was reported. An editorial on nanozymes titled "Can Nanozymes Have an Impact on Sensing?" was published.

2020s 
A single-atom nanozyme was developed for sepsis management. Self-assembled single-atom nanozyme was developed for photodynamic therapy of tumors. An ultrasound-switchable nanozyme against multidrug-resistant bacterial infection was reported. A nanozyme-based H2O2 homeostasis disruptor for chemodynamic tumor therapy was reported. An iridium oxide nanozyme for cascade reaction was developed for tumor therapy. A book entitled Nanozymology was published. A free radical–scavenging nanosponge was engineered for ischemic stroke. A minireview was published on gold-conjugate-based nanozymes. SnSe nanosheets as dehydrogenase mimics were developed. A carbon dot–based topoisomerase I mimic was reported to cleave DNA. Nanozyme sensor arrays were developed to detect pesticides. Bioorthogonal nanozymes were used to treat bacterial biofilms. A rhodium nanozyme was developed for treat colon disease. A Fe-N-C nanozyme was developed to study drug–drug interactions. A polymeric nanozyme was developed for second near-infrared photothermal cancer ferrotherapy. A  nanozyme was reported for anti-inflammation therapy. A CeO2@ZIF-8 nanozyme was developed to treat reperfusion-induced injury in ischemic stroke. Peroxidase-like activity of Fe3O4 was explored to study the electrocatalytic kinetics at the single-molecule/single-particle level. A Cu-TA nanozyme was fabricated to scavenge reactive oxygen species from cigarette smoke. A metalloenzyme-like copper nanocluster was reported to have anticancer and imaging activities simultaneously. An integrated nanozyme was developed for anti-inflammation therapy. Enhanced enzyme-like catalytic activity was reported under non-equilibrium conditions for gold nanozymes. A density functional theory method was proposed to predict the activities of peroxidase-like nanozymes. A hydrolytic nanozyme was developed to construct an immunosensor. An orally administered nanozyme was developed for inflammatory bowel disease therapy. A ligand‐dependent activity engineering strategy was reported to develop a glutathione peroxidase–mimicking MIL‐47(V) metal–organic framework nanozyme for therapy. A single-site nanozyme was developed for tumor therapy. A SOD-like nanozyme was developed to regulate the mitochondria and neural cell function. A Pd12 coordination cage as a photoregulated oxidase-like nanozyme was developed. An NADPH oxidase-like nanozyme was developed. A catalase-like nanozyme was developed for tumor therapy. A defect‐rich adhesive molybdenum disulfide/reduced graphene oxide nanozyme was developed for anti-bacterial activity. A MOF@COF nanozyme was developed for anti-bacterial activity. Plasmonic nanozymes were reported. Tumor microenvironment–responsive nanozyme was developed for tumor therapy. A protein-engineering-inspired method was developed to design highly active nanozymes. An editorial on nanozymes definition was published. A nanozyme therapy for hyperuricemia and ischemic stroke was developed. Chemistry World published a perspective on artificial enzymes and nanozymes. A review on single-atom catalysts, including single-atom nanozymes, was published. Peroxidase-like mixed-FeCo-oxide-based surface-textured nanostructures (MTex) were used for biofilm eradication. A nanozyme with better kinetics than natural peroxidase was developed. A self-protecting nanozyme was developed for Alzheimer's disease. CuSe nanozymes was developed to treat Parkinson's disease. A nanocluster-based nanozyme was developed. Glucose oxidase–like gold nanoparticles combined with cyclodextran were used for chiral catalysis. An artificial binuclear copper monooxygenase in a MOF was developed. A review on highly efficient design of nanozymes was published. Ni–Pt peroxidase mimics were developed for bioanalysis. A POM-based nanozyme was reported to protect cells from reactive oxygen species. A gating strategy was used to prepare selective nanozymes. A manganese single-atom nanozyme was developed for tumor therapy. A pH-responsive oxidase-like graphitic nanozyme was developed for selective killing of Helicobacter pylori. An engineered FeN3P-centred single-atom nanozyme was developed. Peroxidase- and catalase-like activities of gold nanozymes were modulated. Graphdiyne–cerium oxide nanozymes were developed for radiotherapy of esophageal cancer. Defect engineering was used to develop nanozyme for tumor therapy. A book entitled Nanozymes for Environmental Engineering was published. A palladium single-atom nanozyme was developed for tumor therapy. A horseradish peroxidase–like nanozyme was developed for tumor therapy. The mechanism of a GOx-like nanozyme was reported. A review on nanozymes was published. A mechanism study on nanonuclease-like nanozyme was reported. A perspective on nanozyme definition was published. Aptananozymes were developed. Ceria nanozyme loaded microneedles helped hair regrowth. A catalase-like platinum nanozyme was used for small extracellular vesicles analysis. A book on Nanozymes: Advances and Applications was published by CRC Press. A review on nanozyme catalytic turnover was published. A nanozyme was developed for ratiometric molecular imaging. A Fe3O4/Ag/Bi2MoO6 photoactivatable nanozyme was developed for cancer therapy. Co/C as an NADH oxidase mimic was reported. An iron oxide nanozyme was used to target biofilms causing tooth decay. A new strategy for high-performance nanozymes was developed. A high-throughput computational screening strategy was developed to discover SOD-like nanozymes. An review paper entitled "Nanozyme-Enabled Analytical Chemistry" was published in Analytical Chemistry. A nanozyme-based therapy for gout was reported. A data-informed strategy for discovery of nanozymes was reported. Prussian blue nanozyme was used to alleviates neurodegeneration. A dual element single-atom nanozyme was developed. A valence-engineered method was developed to design antioxidant banozyme for biomedical applications. Combined with small interfering RNA, ceria nanozyme was used for synergistic treatment of neurodegenerative diseases. A universial assay for catalase-like nanozymes was reported. A nanozyme catalyzed CRISPR assay was developed. A nanozyme-based tumor-specific photo-enhanced catalytic therapy was developed. Single-atom nanozymes for brain trauma therapy were reported. An edge engineering strategy was developed to fabriacte single atom nanozymes. A single atom nanozyme was developed to modulate tumor microenvironment for therapy. A new mechanism for peroxidase-like Fe3O4 was proposed. A plant virus cleaving nanozyme was reported. Nanozymes is selected as one of the IUPAC Top Ten Emerging Technologies in Chemistry 2022. A book entitled "Nanozymes: Design, Synthesis, and Applications" was published by ACS. Nanozymes were used to remove and degrade microplastics. A cold-adapted nanozyme was reported. A MOF-818 nanozyme with antioxidase-mimicking activities was used to treat diabetic chronic wounds. Cu single-atom nanozymes were developed for catalytic tumor-specific therapy. Machine learning was employed to search for nanozymes. Enzyme-like meso-bacroporous carbon sphere was developed. A combination of DNAzyme and nanozyme was reported.

See also 

 Abzyme
 Biomimetics
 Carbon nanotube
 Catalysis
 Density functional theory
 Directed evolution
 Enzyme
 Fullerene
 Graphene
 Metal-organic framework
 Molecular machine
 Molecularly imprinted polymer
 Nanochemistry
 Origin of life
 Supramolecular chemistry
 Synzyme
 Zeolite

References 

Enzymes
Synthetic biology
Nanotechnology